Kutbettin Arzu (born 1 April 1955) is a Turkish politician who served as the Minister of Food, Agriculture and Livestock in the interim election government formed by Prime Minister Ahmet Davutoğlu between 28 August and 17 November 2015. He is a former Justice and Development Party (AKP) politician, having served as a Member of Parliament for the electoral district of Diyarbakır between 2007 and 2011. He was the AKP's mayoral candidate for Diyarbakır in the 2009 local elections, but lost to the pro-Kurdish Democratic Society Party (DTP).

Early life and career
Kutbettin Arzu was born on 1 April 1955 in the village of Bahteri, Diyarbakır. He graduated from the Department of Architecture at the Karadeniz Technical University Faculty of Architecture and Engineering. He obtained his master's degree in the same university and department. He worked as the Chief Architect at the 15th Regional Directorate of Construction Works, later forming his own Engineering-Architecture company. He was appointed as an honorary lecturer at Dicle University Faculty of Architecture and Engineering and served as the President of the Diyarbakır Chamber of Architects.

He has also served as a Diyarbakir Red Crescent Society member, Culture and Solidarity Foundation member, Aceveda Foundation Regional Advisory Council member, Diyarbakir Chamber of Commerce Board member and later President, TOBB Trade and Industry Chamber Council Member and as the Diyarbakır Organized Industrial Zone Entrepreneur Committee Vice Chairman.

Politics

Parliamentary career
Arzu joined the Justice and Development Party (AKP) and became a Member of Parliament for the electoral district of Diyarbakır between 2007 and 2011, elected in the 2007 general election. In 2011, he was appointed as the Deputy Minister of Agriculture. He was the AKP's mayoral candidate for Diyarbakır in the 2009 local elections, but lost to the pro-Kurdish Democratic Society Party (DTP).

Minister of Food, Agriculture and Livestock
After the June 2015 general election resulted in a hung parliament, unsuccessful coalition negotiations raised speculation over whether President Recep Tayyip Erdoğan would call an early election in the event that AKP leader Ahmet Davutoğlu was unable to form a government within the given constitutional time of 45 days. As required by the 114th article of the Constitution of Turkey, the calling of a snap general election by the President necessitates the forming of an interim election government, in which all parties represented in Parliament are given a certain number of ministers according to how many MPs they have. If a party refused to send ministers to the interim cabinet, then independents must take their place.

Erdoğan called a new general election for November 2015 in late August, with Davutoğlu being tasked with the formation of the interim government. With the main opposition Republican People's Party (CHP) and the Nationalist Movement Party (MHP) refusing to send ministers to the cabinet, the 8 ministries that the two parties were entitled to were vacated for independents. As a result, Arzu was appointed Minister of Food, Agriculture and Livestock as an independent politician, resigning his AKP membership in order to participate.

Appointment controversy
Although Arzu is technically required to be independent of any political party due to his civil service position and his role in the interim election government, he had served as a Justice and Development Party (AKP) MP from 2007 to 2011 and Deputy Minister of Agriculture from 2011 to 2015, only resigning his party membership so that he could participate in the election government as an independent. His close affiliation to the AKP despite supposedly being an independent resulted in opposition media outlets branding him, as well as numerous other 'independent' cabinet ministers close to the AKP, as 'partisan independents'.

See also
Mehmet Mehdi Eker

References

External links
MP profile on the Grand National Assembly website
Collection of all relevant news items at Haberler.com

Living people
1955 births
People from Diyarbakır
Justice and Development Party (Turkey) politicians
Turkish architects
Deputies of Diyarbakır
Members of the 23rd Parliament of Turkey
Members of the 63rd government of Turkey
Karadeniz Technical University alumni
Turkish Kurdish politicians